The lesser forest shrew (Sylvisorex oriundus) is a species of mammal in the family Soricidae endemic to northeastern Democratic Republic of the Congo, where its type locality is at Medje. Its natural habitat is subtropical or tropical moist lowland forest.

References

Sylvisorex
Mammals described in 1916
Endemic fauna of the Democratic Republic of the Congo
Taxonomy articles created by Polbot
Northeastern Congolian lowland forests